Jean Belvaux (8 December 1894 – 12 March 1955) was a Belgian racing cyclist. He rode in the 1921 Tour de France.

References

1894 births
1955 deaths
Belgian male cyclists
Place of birth missing